There are many traditions and anecdotes associated with the Stanley Cup. The Stanley Cup is the championship trophy of the National Hockey League (NHL), the major professional ice hockey league in Canada and the United States. It is commonly referred to as simply "The Cup", "The Holy Grail" or facetiously (chiefly by sportswriters) as "Lord Stanley's Mug".

Unlike the trophies awarded by the other three major professional sports leagues in the United States and Canada, a new Stanley Cup is not made annually; the champions keep the Cup until a new champion is crowned. It is also one of only two trophies in professional North American sports which has the name of the winning players, coaches, management, and club staff engraved upon it, the other being the CFL's Grey Cup.

It is at the centre of several legends and superstitions. Many of these anecdotes involve the Stanley Cup being mistreated in some way. It is the most-travelled championship trophy in the world.

Traditions

Drinking
One of the oldest traditions, started by the 1896 Winnipeg Victorias, dictates that the winning team drink champagne from the top bowl after their victory.

On-ice presentation
Another tradition is the on-ice presentation of the Cup by the NHL commissioner to the captain of the winning team after the series-winning victory, and the subsequent carrying of the trophy around the rink by each member of the victorious club. This differs from the championship trophy ceremonies in the other three major professional sports leagues in the United States and Canada, where the commissioners of Major League Baseball, National Basketball Association, and National Football League instead present the Commissioner's Trophy, Larry O'Brien Championship Trophy, and Vince Lombardi Trophy, respectively, to the owners of the winning team. In recent years, the on-ice presentation of the Cup has been preceded by the presentation of the Conn Smythe Trophy.

Possibly the first time that the Cup was awarded on the ice was to the 1932 Toronto Maple Leafs, and the practice became an annual tradition in the 1950s.

Captain hoisting the cup
Ted Lindsay of the 1950 Cup champion Detroit Red Wings became the first player (Sid Abel was captain of Red Wings in 1950), upon receiving the Cup, to skate around with it, slightly raised for the crowd. Since then, it has been a tradition to have the captain of the winning team take a lap around the ice first with the trophy hoisted above his head (the hoisting of the Cup above their heads is sometimes credited to Frank Mahovlich of the Toronto Maple Leafs, who was photographed doing so after the 1963 Stanley Cup finals). There are a few exceptions:

1988
In what would be Wayne Gretzky's final Cup win and final game as a member of the Edmonton Oilers, he gathered his teammates, coaches, trainers, and others from the Oilers organization to join at centre ice for an impromptu team photo with the trophy. This tradition has been continued by every subsequent Stanley Cup champion.

1993
The 1993 championship was won by the Montreal Canadiens. As Gary Bettman presented the Cup to Canadiens' captain Guy Carbonneau, Carbonneau waved to Denis Savard to come join him. Savard, who had played 10 seasons for the Chicago Blackhawks before being traded to Montreal in 1990–91 (the Blackhawks had since been to a Stanley Cup Final in 1992), had not played in a Cup Final in his career. Carbonneau let Savard hoist the Cup in his place.

1998
The 1998 championship was won by the defending champions Detroit Red Wings. The previous year, several days after their first Stanley Cup in 42 years, Vladimir Konstantinov had been paralyzed in an automobile accident that also paralyzed team masseur Sergei Mnatsakanov. As Bettman gave the cup to Red Wings' captain Steve Yzerman, he hoisted it before putting it on Konstantinov's lap and helping him parade with the trophy.

2001
The 2001 championship was won by the Colorado Avalanche. Until requesting a trade on March 6, 2000, Ray Bourque had played his entire career with the Boston Bruins. The seventh game of the 2001 Finals was the last of Bourque's 22-year NHL career. Though Bourque reached the Stanley Cup Finals twice with the Bruins in 1988 and 1990, the Bruins fell both times to the Edmonton Oilers, and Bourque had never been on a Cup-winning team until joining the Avalanche. When captain Joe Sakic received the trophy, he did not hoist it, but instead immediately handed it to Bourque for him to hoist. Sakic then followed Bourque in hoisting the trophy.

Touching the Cup
Another tradition (or rather superstition) that is prevalent among today's NHL players is that no player should touch the Cup itself until his team has rightfully won the Cup. Adding to this superstition is some players' choice to neither touch nor hoist the conference trophies (Clarence S. Campbell Bowl and Prince of Wales Trophy) when these series have been won; the players feel that the Stanley Cup is the true championship trophy, and only it should be hoisted.

New York Islanders captain Denis Potvin hoisted the Wales Trophy during the 1982 and 1983 playoffs en route to the club successfully defending the Cup each time, sweeping the Vancouver Canucks in 1982 and the Edmonton Oilers in 1983. During the Islanders' first two runs to the Cup, no conference championship trophy was presented during the playoffs; instead, the Wales Trophy and the Campbell Bowl were awarded to the teams with the best regular season records in the respective conferences (the Islanders won the Campbell Bowl in 1980–81).

However, in 1994, Stephane Matteau, then of the New York Rangers, admitted that he tapped the Wales Trophy with his stick's blade before the overtime period in game seven of the Eastern Conference Final. Matteau subsequently scored the game-winning goal in double overtime against the New Jersey Devils. Following the game, Mark Messier, the captain of the Rangers, picked up and raised the Wales Trophy after it was awarded to the team. After winning the Western Conference, Vancouver Canucks captain Trevor Linden lifted the Campbell trophy. The Rangers prevailed over the Canucks in a seven-game series to win the Cup.

Scott Stevens and Martin Brodeur hoisted the Wales trophy as well in 2000, after the New Jersey Devils came back from a 3–1 series deficit to defeat the Philadelphia Flyers in seven games; the Devils would go on to defeat the Dallas Stars (who touched but did not lift the Campbell Bowl) in the Stanley Cup Finals. Stevens also lifted the Wales trophy en route to the Devils' 1995 and 2003 Stanley Cup wins. In 2002 the Carolina Hurricanes hoisted the Wales Trophy after they won their conference title; the Hurricanes lost their Finals series with the Detroit Red Wings four games to one. Steve Yzerman, captain of the Red Wings during their 1997, 1998, and 2002 Stanley Cup victories, picked up the Campbell Bowl prior to that year's final.

The superstition held true in 2004, as Jarome Iginla of the Calgary Flames grabbed the Campbell Bowl, but Dave Andreychuk of the Tampa Bay Lightning refused to touch the Wales Trophy; the Lightning won the Stanley Cup in seven games. In 2007, Daniel Alfredsson and Wade Redden of the Ottawa Senators touched and picked up the Wales Trophy, respectively, but Anaheim Ducks captain Scott Niedermayer never came close to the Campbell Bowl; the Ducks won the Stanley Cup in five games.

In 2008, neither the Pittsburgh Penguins' Sidney Crosby nor the Red Wings' Nicklas Lidstrom touched their respective conference trophies; the Red Wings won the Stanley Cup that year. The following year, however, Crosby decided to touch the Wales Trophy, and the Penguins went on to win the Stanley Cup. They did the same thing again in winning the 2016 and 2017 Stanley Cups; conversely, the San Jose Sharks' Joe Pavelski stayed true to the general tradition and did not touch the Campbell Bowl. Pittsburgh then went on to defeat San Jose in six games to win the Cup. The same occurred to the Nashville Predators when captain Mike Fisher refused to touch the Campbell Bowl one year later. One possible reason for Crosby lifting the trophy is that the Penguins have had good luck winning the Stanley Cup after lifting the Wales trophy; this was evident when Mario Lemieux lifted the Wales en route to the Penguins' 1991 and 1992 Cup wins.

In 2010, Philadelphia Flyers captain Mike Richards picked up the Wales Trophy, while Chicago Blackhawks captain Jonathan Toews did not touch the Campbell Bowl. The Blackhawks went on to defeat the Flyers in six games for the 2010 Stanley Cup. Subsequently, between 2011 and 2015, none of the Stanley Cup finalists touched either the Campbell or the Wales trophies. The 2012 Los Angeles Kings, after defeating the Phoenix Coyotes in five games, went so far as leaving the Campbell Bowl in Phoenix. Instead Tim Leiweke, President and CEO of Anschutz Entertainment Group (the parent of the LA Kings), drove the trophy in his car trunk from Phoenix to Los Angeles and showed it to the 10,000+ fans that waited at LAX Airport to show their support to their Stanley Cup finalists, who went on to win the Stanley Cup. This was in marked contrast to 1993, when the Kings had defeated the Toronto Maple Leafs in seven games to reach their first Final, where Wayne Gretzky and the team celebrated with the Campbell Bowl, and during the Final, the trophy was unveiled before the start of game three (the Kings lost the series in five games, including three overtime losses).

In 2018, both conference champions, the Vegas Golden Knights and Washington Capitals, picked up the Campbell Bowl and Prince of Wales Trophy, respectively, marking the first time since 2002 both conference championship trophies were skated. Deryk Engelland accepted the Campbell Bowl for the Golden Knights, becoming the first player to pick up the trophy on the ice since Iginla 14 years earlier. Capitals superstar Alexander Ovechkin skated the Prince of Wales Trophy with his teammates, then won the Conn Smythe Trophy after leading Washington to the Stanley Cup, its first championship in franchise history.

In 2019, neither Boston Bruins' captain Zdeno Chára nor St. Louis Blues' captain Alex Pietrangelo touched their respective conference trophies. This was the first time since 2015 that neither conference championship trophy was hoisted.

In that 2015 season, Lightning captain Steven Stamkos followed Andreychuk's example from 2004 by refusing to touch the Prince of Wales Trophy. However, the Lightning lost to the Blackhawks in the finals, so when the team won their third Eastern Conference championship five seasons later, Stamkos changed course and touched the trophy. Stamkos likewise touched the Wales trophy again in 2021 and 2022. The Lightning defied superstition by winning both the 2020 and 2021 Stanley Cup.

The Dallas Stars had previously touched the Campbell Bowl in 1999 and 2000 with Derian Hatcher as the captain; in the former season, the Stars won the Cup. But when the Stars won again in 2020, captain Jamie Benn refused to touch the trophy. Similarly, the Montreal Canadiens' captain Guy Carbonneau had hoisted the Wales Trophy in 1993 and went on to win the Cup, but when they won the semifinal round in 2021, captain Shea Weber refused to touch the Campbell Bowl. In both cases, the Stars and Canadiens lost in the Cup Finals to the Lightning.

The Colorado Avalanche, led by then-captain Joe Sakic, had previously touched the Campbell Bowl en route to their 1996 and 2001 Cup wins. So when the team won the Campbell again in 2022, captain Gabriel Landeskog elected to touch the Campbell Bowl. The Avalanche ended up winning the Stanley Cup that year, defeating the two-time defending champion Lightning.

Five of the last six Stanley Cup champions from the Eastern Conference have picked up the Prince of Wales Trophy. The exception was the 2011 Bruins, captained by Chára.

Adventures
One of the most recognized trophies in professional sports in the US and Canada, the Cup has logged more than  during the past five seasons alone.

Players' day with cup
Players have unofficially had a private day with the Cup, a tradition that started with the New Jersey Devils in 1995 wherein each member of the Cup-winning team is allowed personal possession of the Cup for a day. It is always accompanied by at least one representative from the Hockey Hall of Fame. The tradition became subject of an ESPN marketing campaign which showed players using the Cup: Ken Daneyko ate cereal out of it, Derian Hatcher used it as a cooler at a party, and Brett Hull locked himself out of his vehicle with the Cup inside while out shopping with Mike Modano. Tomas Holmström's cousin, Robert, used the trophy to baptize his seven-week-old daughter during Tomas' day with the Cup. Clark Gillies of the New York Islanders allowed his dog to eat out of the Cup. Dustin Brown of the Los Angeles Kings had his two older boys drink chocolate milk out of the cup. In 2015, Chico Resch, 1979-80 Stanley Cup champion with the New York Islanders, was arranged for the opportunity to spend his day with the Trophy, an honor that was unavailable in his playing days. This happened upon his retirement as a color commentator for New Jersey Devils.

Europe
The Cup first left North America in 1996 when it went to Sweden with Peter Forsberg; he took it to Stockholm as well as to his hometown Örnsköldsvik.
In Russia, it has been to Red Square and a soccer game at Luzhniki Stadium in Moscow, and to a monument near Yekaterinburg marking the geographic boundary between Europe and Asia. It went west to Kyiv, Ukraine, for the first time with Tampa Bay Game-7 hero Ruslan Fedotenko; Carolina Hurricanes defenceman Anton Babchuk returned with it, again to Kyiv. After 114 years, the Cup made a trip in April 2006 back to London, where it was originally made. A plaque was placed at the site of the store where Lord Stanley purchased the Cup. In 2007, the Cup went to Helsinki, Finland, with Anaheim Ducks' forward Teemu Selänne. Tomas Holmström took the trophy to his hometown Piteå in Sweden in the summer of 2008. He used the trophy as a baptismal font for his niece, and also as a serving dish for pitepalt. Boston Bruins' captain Zdeno Chára took the Cup to Slovakia after winning it in 2011. In 2012, Anže Kopitar took the Cup to his home country of Slovenia and hoisted it atop Bled Castle after the Los Angeles Kings won that year.

North America

The Stanley Cup went to Port Dover, Ontario, with Jassen Cullimore when the Tampa Bay Lightning won the cup. He was the fourth NHLer to take the cup to this small hockey town on the shore of Lake Erie. It went to Simcoe, Ontario with Rob Blake when the Colorado Avalanche won the cup. A parade was held in his honor, and a private party was thrown for family and friends. Assistant Coach Colin Campbell took it to his hometown Tillsonburg, Ontario after the New York Rangers won in 1994. Daniel Cleary took the Cup to his hometown of Harbour Grace, Newfoundland.  As the first Newfoundlander to win the Cup, he attracted an estimated crowd of 27,000 to the tiny community of just over 3,000.  The Cup went to the top of Fisher Peak, near Cranbrook, British Columbia and the top of Mt. Elbert in Colorado. Brad Richards from Murray Harbour, Prince Edward Island took the Stanley Cup out on a fishing boat after the Tampa Bay Lightning won the cup. It went to an Aboriginal Métis Nation Settlement, and it went to an igloo in Rankin Inlet. It served as the engagement ring bearer for the Tampa Bay Lightning's André Roy while in a helicopter flown by Guy Lafleur.

The Cup has experienced Los Angeles celebrity glamour, having been taken on a roller coaster ride at Universal Studios Hollywood, and to the Hollywood Sign by Luc Robitaille. It also took part in the 2008 Tournament of Roses Parade as part of Anaheim city's float, accompanied by player Brad May as his Anaheim Ducks team were the current reigning champions.

It was also a White House guest of Ronald Reagan, George H. W. Bush, Bill Clinton, George W. Bush, Barack Obama, Donald Trump, and Joe Biden, and it is currently a tradition of the U.S. president to invite the NHL champion if the team is from an American city. It is a similar tradition for the Prime Minister of Canada to invite the winners, if it is a Canadian team that wins, to Ottawa (however, no Canadian team has won the Cup since the Montreal Canadiens did so in 1993). The Cup has appeared on Corner Gas, the Late Show with David Letterman, Meet the Press with Tim Russert, Late Night with Conan O'Brien, The Tonight Show with Jay Leno, and The Tonight Show with Jimmy Fallon. It has served as the baptismal font for Sylvain Lefebvre's daughter.

The Cup has even gained experience as an "actor".  It has appeared in several scenes of the long-running soap opera Guiding Light. It also appeared on Boston Legal where William Shatner knocked it off a balcony, and on the 30 Rock episode "Subway Hero".  It also appeared on Chicago Fire along with the Keeper of the Cup, Phil Pritchard.

On a humanitarian note, the Cup visited wounded United States Marines at Camp Lejeune with Glen Wesley after his Carolina Hurricanes won the Cup in 2006.

After the Chicago Blackhawks win in 2010 the Cup appeared in the 2010 Chicago Gay Pride Parade, with team representative defenceman Brent Sopel. Sopel appeared to honor his friend, Toronto Maple Leafs general manager Brian Burke, Burke's late son, Brendan and the Burkes' example of family support and tolerance.

During decommissioning of the Space Shuttle Atlantis, the Cup visited the orbiter's flight deck after being taken to Florida. Jeremy Jacobs, the owner of the 2011 NHL champion Boston Bruins, took the Cup to Florida for employees involved in the decommissioning to view and photograph.

On May 7, 2016, the morning of the Kentucky Derby, the NHL brought the Cup to Churchill Downs in Louisville, Kentucky for a photo session with race favorite Nyquist, named after then-Detroit Red Wings player Gustav Nyquist. Nyquist would go on to win the Derby.

When the Washington Capitals won the Cup in 2018, team captain Alex Ovechkin and his teammates took the Cup around Washington, DC and celebrated with the team's fans. Among the many locations where Ovechkin took the cup included other sporting events and public squares.

Afghanistan
On May 2, 2007, the Stanley Cup arrived in Kandahar on a Canadian Forces C-130 Hercules transport aircraft. Seventeen former players played a ball hockey game versus Canadian soldiers on a concrete rink in the Afghan desert.

Misadventures
The Cup has also been mistreated, misplaced, or otherwise misused on numerous occasions.

One legend is that in 1905, a member of the Ottawa Senators (also known as the "Ottawa Silver Seven") tried to drop kick the Cup across the Rideau Canal after the championship banquet. The attempt failed, and the Cup was not retrieved until the next day; luckily the canal was still frozen over. The Ottawas had been celebrating their decisive Stanley Cup win over the Dawson City Nuggets. Several of the Ottawa players were also members of the Ottawa Football Club. However, Bill Westwick, Ottawa Journal sports editor and the son of Silver Seven player Rat Westwick, and NHL commissioner Frank Calder both deny it ever happened. No contemporary reports support the legend, although champagne was drunk from the Cup that night.

In 1906, weeks after members of the Montreal Wanderers left it at a photographer's studio, officials learned that the photographer's mother was using the Cup to plant geraniums. In 1907, a Kenora Thistles team manager threatened to throw the Cup into the Lake of the Woods in a dispute over the eligibility of two Thistles players.

In 1924, members of the Montreal Canadiens, en route to celebrate their win at owner Leo Dandurand's home, left it by the road after repairing a flat tire. The Cup was recovered exactly where they left it. In 1925, Lynn and Muzz Patrick, the sons of Victoria Cougars manager-coach Lester Patrick, discovered the Cup in the basement of their home, and scratched their names on it with a nail. In 1940, their names were properly engraved on it as members of the champion New York Rangers. They also urinated in the Cup with teammates.

During the 1940–41 NHL season, the mortgage on Madison Square Garden was paid. The management publicly celebrated by burning the mortgage in the Cup. Some fans claimed this act "desecrated" the Cup, leading to the Curse of 1940, which allegedly caused the Rangers to wait 54 years for another win.

In 1957, Maurice "Rocket" Richard chipped both of his front teeth while drinking from the Stanley Cup.

In the Chicago Stadium, in the spring of 1961, the Montreal Canadiens were losing the final game of a playoff series to the Chicago Blackhawks. A Montreal fan (Ken Kilander) in the stands was upset, so he left his seat, ran down to the front lobby and broke into the glass showcase where the Stanley Cup was on display. He grabbed the Cup, hoisted it over his shoulders and made for the exit before he was arrested. In court, he explained his behaviour to the judge: "Your Honor, I was simply bringing the Cup back to Montreal where it belongs."

In 1962, the Toronto Maple Leafs won the Stanley Cup. During a party after the win, the trophy was dropped in a bonfire and badly damaged. It was repaired at the expense of the team.

In 1964, Red Kelly of the Toronto Maple Leafs posed for a photo with his infant son sitting in the Cup, only to find the child had urinated in it. Kelly was quoted years later as saying it has always since made him laugh to see players drinking out of the Cup.

In 1970, after much wear and tear, the Cup was fully replaced with a duplicate known as the "Presentation Cup" made in 1963 and a second duplicate called the "Permanent Cup", which remains at the Hockey Hall of Fame. From this point on, in official functions and player days with the Cup, it is the Presentation Cup that is in circulation.

Clark Gillies of the New York Islanders filled the Cup with dog food and let his dog eat out of it. He defended doing so by saying "He's a good dog."

The New York Islanders' Bryan Trottier admitted to sleeping with the Cup (as have, apparently, dozens of players).

In 1987, the Edmonton Oilers' Mark Messier took it to his favourite club in his hometown of St. Albert, Alberta, and let fans drink out of it. It wound up slightly bent in various places for unknown reasons. It was repaired at a local automotive shop, and shipped back to the Hockey Hall of Fame.

The 1991 Pittsburgh Penguins and 1993 Montreal Canadiens decided to test its buoyancy by tossing it into Mario Lemieux's and Patrick Roy's respective pools ("The Stanley Cup"—noted then–Canadiens' captain Guy Carbonneau—"does not float."). Dominik Hašek had his 2002 visit with the Cup cut short for doing the same.

After the Montreal Canadiens Cup win in 1993, members of the team apparently signed their names on the inside of the Cup with a sharp object.

After the parade in their honor in 1994, members of the New York Rangers, including Mike Richter, took the cup to McSorley's Old Ale House, locked the doors, and for 45 minutes allowed the patrons to hoist it above their heads and drink McSorley's Dark and Light out of it.  The New York Post reported the next day that the cup was taken back by the league for "repairs" to its base.  Later, several New York Rangers took the Cup to Belmont Park, filled it with oats, and let Kentucky Derby winner Go for Gin eat out of it.

The 1999 Dallas Stars' Stanley Cup party was hosted at the house of Stars defenceman Craig Ludwig and Pantera drummer Vinnie Paul. At the party, Stars forward Guy Carbonneau (apparently having forgotten the Cup's lack of buoyancy from his 1993 adventures) allegedly attempted to throw the Cup from the upstairs deck into the house's Crown Royal shaped pool below. The Cup caught the lip of the pool, producing a large dent. Mike Bolt, one of the "Keepers of the Cup" for the NHL, stated that this never happened. "What happened was that one of the players was posing with it next to the pool when someone pushed him into the water, and it went in with him. It was in the water maybe two seconds," Bolt said. "It was a real good party from what I understand." The trophy was dented the previous day, when a player dropped it during a locker room celebration, Bolt said.

In 1999 and 2003, the cup made a trip to Joe Nieuwendyk's alma mater, Cornell University, both times visiting a local college bar. In 2003, Martin Brodeur ate popcorn out of the Cup. It had butter stains and salt damage for the next eight days before Jamie Langenbrunner cleaned it. In 2003, the Cup was slated to make its first-ever visit to Slovakia with New Jersey Devils' Jiri Bicek, but was left behind in Canada; it was on the next flight out of Toronto. Finally, on August 22, 2004, Walter Neubrand, keeper of the Cup, boarded a plane to Fort St. John, British Columbia, to deliver it to Tampa Bay Lightning head scout Jake Goertzen. However, Air Canada officials at Vancouver International Airport removed it before takeoff because of weight restrictions. It was flown to Fort St. John the following day.

In 2007, a photoshoot on the set of the NBC television series Heroes showed actors Milo Ventimiglia and Hayden Panettiere "goofing off" with the cup, including worshiping, walking with, and Hayden licking and kissing the trophy.

Also, in May 2007, the cup made it to the set of ABC's Boston Legal, a series written and created by former college hockey player David E. Kelley.  In the Episode "Duck and Cover", Denny Crane pulls some strings to get his hands on the Cup for a day.  While on loan, he takes it up to his office where he decides to engrave his name on it, noting that, "They'll never notice.  It's got so many dings on it already."  That evening, he takes it to his penthouse office patio where he decides to drink scotch out of it with Alan Shore.  After they take turns drinking out of the Cup, Denny sets it on the balcony ledge in preparation for taking pictures with it, but accidentally knocks it over.  With a long, speechless pause, they watch the Cup tumble off the balcony to land on the street below.  And with a loud, graceless metallic 'clunk', Alan comments, "That will leave a significant ding!" 

On June 7, 2007, after the Anaheim Ducks won the Cup, their captain Scott Niedermayer brought the trophy to the set in Los Angeles of Jim Rome is Burning. While the Cup was on set, the associate producer of JRIB, Travis Rodgers, hoisted and posed with the Cup. The images were then posted on Jim Rome's website, which upset many Canadians, who called Rome's radio show on June 8 to complain that Rodgers had disrespected the Cup. Don Cherry called into the program to defend Rodgers, stating his belief that he did not disrespect the Cup at all.

On June 6, 2008, after the Red Wings' Stanley Cup Parade, the Stanley Cup was pushed off a table at Chris Chelios' Chili Bar in Detroit, Michigan and received a dent, which was later smoothed out.  After the 2008 NHL Awards, it was revealed that the damage was more extensive than originally realized.

A week after the same Detroit team won the Cup, Kris Draper's newborn daughter defecated in the Cup as she sat in it. The Cup was thoroughly cleaned and Draper reportedly drank from it that same day.

On October 9, 2008, Def Leppard's Joe Elliott placed the Cup upside down on a pedestal on the stage during one of their NHL Face-Off Rocks segments at the Fox Theater in Detroit.  Red Wings defenseman Chris Chelios claimed the musician disgraced the Cup on purpose. Shortly after the incident, an article on Def Leppard's website appeared with Elliott claiming that every other sports cup he had ever seen before then was smaller at its base than at the top, so he thought this cup was no different.

On June 17, 2010, the Chicago Tribune swabbed the Cup for germs. A lab tech for EMSL Analytical stated no staph, salmonella or E. coli were found and the general bacteria count was 4% of what is typically found on an office desk. On April 21, 2011, it was traveling in Quebec City when its vehicle broke down forcing keeper of the Cup Mike Bolt to hitchhike with the Cup.

On August 30, 2011, during Michael Ryder's day with the cup, it fell off a table at a media event in St. John's, Newfoundland and Labrador. This was just prior to the Cup's departure to Ryder's home town of Bonavista, Newfoundland and Labrador.

On July 12, 2021, during a strong thunderstorm at an outdoor celebration following the conclusion of the Tampa Bay Lightning's victory parade, Patrick Maroon accidentally dropped the Stanley Cup due to the rainy conditions, damaging the bowl. The Cup had to be sent back to be repaired in Montreal before the players could have their day with the trophy.

On June 26, 2022, during the on-ice celebrations immediately after winning the Stanley Cup, Nicolas Aubé-Kubel of the Colorado Avalanche tripped on his way to the team photo and fell to the ice denting the base of the cup in the process.

References

Citations

Bibliography
 

Stanley Cup